Timur Mikailovich Rodriguez (born Kerimov, October 14, 1979 in Penza), often stylized as T-moor Rodriguez, is a Russian showman, singer, TV and radio personality, known for his participation on the TV projects KVN, Comedy Club and «Yuzhnoye Butovo», and leading programs «Crocodile», «Sexy chart» and «Dances without rules».

Timur's father Mikail Karimov (Микаил Керимов) is Azerbaijani and his mother Zlata Efimovna Levina (Злата Ефимовна Левина) is Jewish. Mikayil is an actor in a puppet theater and Zlata is a translator and teacher of English and German.

From 2010, Timur became known as the singer, the executor of the songs "Passion" (duet with Ani Lorak), "About You" and "Hurting For You". In April 2011 release of his new single "Tell Me", and in summer – "Out in space", in the autumn of 2011 – "Better not be", in the winter of 2012 – "Welcome to the Night", in the summer of 2012 – "Jump" (duet with DJ Smash), in the autumn of 2012 – "I Believe in Your Love".

Career

Hosted TV shows 

 «Знакомство с мамой» (Muz-TV)
 «Натуральный обмен» (Muz-TV)
 «Чемпионат MИPA» (Muz-TV)
 «Бешенл Джеографик» (TNT Russia)
 «Звезды против Караоке» (TNT Russia)
 «Танцы без правил» (TNT Russia)
 «Чемодан историй» (Mir)
 «КомпроМарио» (MUSICBOX)
 «Крокодил» (Muz-TV)
 «Sexy Чарт» (Muz-TV)
 «Музыкальный ринг» (NTV Russia)
 «TOP 10» (MUSICBOX)
 Billboard  чарт (Muz-TV)
 «Минутное Дело»(Rossiya 1)

Filmography 
 Happy Together (2006, TV series) as actor
 Office Romance. Our Time (2011) as showman
 Koschey: The Everlasting Story (2021) as Sword Kladenets (voice)

Music videos

Family 

Timur is married and has 2 children.

References

External links
 
 
 Страничка на promodj.ru
 Interview – Sex and the City

1979 births
Living people
People from Penza
Penza State University alumni
Russian television personalities
Russian pop singers
KVN
Russian people of Azerbaijani descent
Russian Jews
Azerbaijani Jews
English-language singers from Russia
21st-century Russian singers